Dünstekoven is a small farming village in the municipality Swisttal in the North Rhine-Westphalian Rhein-Sieg district. It is situated approximately 20 km west of Bonn. In 2008 it had 620 inhabitants. Duenstekoven is located in the neighbourhood of Heimerzheim.

References

External links 
 * Website of the municipality Swisttal 

Towns in North Rhine-Westphalia